Astragalus  annularis is a species of flowering plant in the legume family, known in Arabic by the common name hurbuth (حُربُث). It is indigenous between Algeria and Iran.

References

annularis
Plants described in 1775
Flora of Lebanon